Alfred Saxby (11 March 1897–1966) was an English footballer who played in the Football League for Chesterfield.

References

1897 births
1966 deaths
English footballers
Association football forwards
English Football League players
Bolsover Colliery F.C. players
Chesterfield F.C. players